Abdul Kerim Pasha (Turkish: Abdülkerim Paşa; born 1872 and died January 16, 1923), also known as Abdülkerim Öpelimi, was an Ottoman commander on the Caucasus front of World War I.

Career 
Abdul Kerim was born into an ethnic Albanian family in Salonica. Abdul Kerim Pasha's first battle was when the Russian general Oganovski launched an offense into the hills west of Manzikert, in 1915. Abdul Kerim Pasha counterattacked against the Russians and defeated Oganovski at the Battle of Manzikert, and captured the town of Manzikert. However Nikolai Yudenich, replaced Oganovski, as Russian commander, and counterattacked, re-taking Manzikert.

Yudenich ordered a retreat from Manzikert, as he was outnumbered by Abdul Kerim Pasha's army, and Kerim pursued. Yudenich defeated Kerim at the Battle of Kara Killisse. Pasha retreated back to Manzikert.

In February 1916, Kerim suffered a major defeat at the Battle of Erzurum. After the battle, Kerim was removed from his position as commander.

In December 1916, he was shortly reinstated as commander of the XX Corps, which was sent to support Bulgaria and Germany on the Salonika front, but already in May 1917, the force was dismantled and recalled to Mesopotamia, where the troops were urgently needed.

Abdul Kerim was married to Mevedet Vlora, the older daughter of Ismail Qemal Bej Vlora.Sara Blloshmi – kurtizane apo agjente e Mbretit Zog? (in Albanian)

Sources

1872 births
1923 deaths
Military personnel from Thessaloniki
Ottoman Military Academy alumni
Ottoman Military College alumni
Ottoman Army generals
Ottoman military personnel of the Italo-Turkish War
Ottoman military personnel of the Balkan Wars
Ottoman military personnel of World War I